Dungeon Masters Screen (later called Dungeon Master's Screen) is an accessory for the Dungeons & Dragons fantasy role-playing game.

Publication history

Advanced Dungeons & Dragons
The 1979 Dungeon Masters Screen was the original dungeon master's screen for the first edition Advanced Dungeons & Dragons rules and came in two pieces: a two-panel piece and a four-panel piece. It included the most important combat rules for quick reference.

The first Dungeon Masters Screen featured a cover by Dave Trampier and was published by TSR in 1979 as two cardboard screens; a second printing in the same year consisted of two cardstock screens, with an Erol Otus painting of a fighter vs. a dragon on the title panel.

The original screen was revised, repackaged, and retitled as REF1, Dungeon Master's Screen, designed by Bob Blake, and published by TSR in 1985 as two three-panel cardstock screens.  The 1985 revision REF1 Dungeon Master's Screen contained revised combat charts and tables. This one included a Dungeon Master's Screen, a Players' Screen, and a covering sheet, giving a summary of player character abilities by level and prime requisites for each class.

Advanced Dungeons & Dragons 2nd edition
A screen for the second edition AD&D rules was designed by Jean Rabe and Bruce Rabe, with a cover by Jeff Easley, and was published by TSR in 1989 as a cardstock screen with a 16-page booklet.

The 1989 second edition AD&D version of REF1 included a scenario called Terrible Trouble at Tragidore, which contained suggestions on how to be a better, more experienced DM. The second edition's revised Dungeon Master Screen & Master Index contains a screen and an index. There are two screens included with a complete list of tables for quick reference including every table: critical hits, miscellaneous equipment and the location of various planes. The two indices contained within the Master Index codify rules and lists from the seven core second edition books, detailing every rule, adjustment, bonus, modifier, magic item, spell and scroll in alphabetical order and cross-referenced with their location in the books.

Another version, the Dungeon Master Screen & Master Index was published by TSR in 1995.

Dungeons & Dragons 3rd edition
A Dungeon Master Screen was published in 2000, developed and assembled by Dale Donovan and Kim Mohan, and featuring cover art by Jeff Easley. A Dungeon Master Screen was also published for the Forgotten Realms campaign, which included a booklet titled "Encounters in Faerûn" designed by Skip Williams and Duane Maxwell, and featuring cover art by Justin Sweet.

Dungeons & Dragons 4th edition
For D&D'''s 4th edition, there was a basic Dungeon Master's Screen published in August 2008. In February 2011, a revised Deluxe Dungeon Master's Screen was released, with heavier cardstock and newer artwork.

Dungeons & Dragons 5th edition

A Dungeon Master's Screen was released for the game's 5th edition in January 2015. A revised version, titled Dungeon Master's Screen Reincarnated featuring revised artwork and charts was released in September 2017. Additionally, campaign-specific screens produced under license by Game Force 9 have been released as tie-ins to the major adventure modules.

Reception
The first edition version of the Dungeon Masters Screen was a Gamer's Choice award-winner.

The revised first edition REF1 screen was given a fairly balanced review by Jez Keen in Imagine magazine. Keene called the info sheet a useful memory aid but missed information on player character races and the types of weapons and armor available to each class. Keen called the Players' Screen "less useful", wondering what exactly the players have to screen. The Players' Screen contained standard tables on spells, weapons, and equipment, as well as the "to hit" tables and, according to Keen, allocates "an extraordinary amount of space" to grenade-like missiles. As for the DM Screen, Keen noted that the tables contain nothing surprising but since the reference tables in the Dungeon Master's Guide are much less useful than those in the Player's Handbook, the reviewer "has used them and will continue to do so".

Trenton Webb reviewed the AD&D second edition Dungeon Master Screen & Master Index for Arcane magazine, rating it a 7 out of 10 overall. He felt that finding information on the screens "can prove a little tricky, since the screens were obviously laid out by Jackson Pollock". He called the indices "an exercise in clear and consise functionality" and that using the "effective notation system, it's easy to find anything" listed in the index, but cautioned that "you have to think in TSR terms and titles to find the entry". Webb summed up his review of the Dungeon Master Screen & Master Index by saying: "The index is essential stuff; the screens less so, since most DMs have evolved their own screen or alternative system for ready reference. But it's well worth £6 to be able to quickly find every rule you know you've read but forgotten previously where..."Dungeons & Dragons Dungeon Masters Screen won the 2015 Gold Ennie Award for "Best Aid/Accessory".

ReviewsMagia i Miecz'' #25 (January 1996) (Polish)

References

Dungeons & Dragons sourcebooks
ENnies winners
Gamemaster's screens
Role-playing game supplements introduced in 1979